Rudolf Kelterborn (3 September 1931 – 24 March 2021) was a Swiss musician and composer.

Life
Born in Basel, Kelterborn studied in Basel, Detmold, Salzburg, and Zürich, among other places, with the composers Walther Geiser, Willy Burkhard, Boris Blacher, Günter Bialas, and Wolfgang Fortner. In his own teaching career, Kelterborn has served as a lecturer and professor at a number of music colleges in Germany and in Switzerland, where he directed the Basel Music Academy from 1983 to 1994. Kelterborn also headed the music division of Swiss German radio from 1974 to 1980.

Farther afield, Kelterborn held guest lecturerships in the United States, England, Japan, China, and Eastern Europe. His works have been performed throughout Europe, the United States, and Japan, and he was also active as a conductor on the international scene.

He died in Basel aged 89.

Works
Kelterborn's oeuvre covers many different musical genres and includes five operas, orchestral works (some with solo instruments, voices, or electronics), chamber music, and vocal works. His four-act opera Der Kirschgarten inaugurated the newly rebuilt Zürich Opera House in 1984.

References

 Andreas Briner: Rudolf Kelterborn: Komponist, Musikdenker, Vermittler (Grümlingen: Zytglogge Verlag, 1993);  
 Michael Kennedy: The Oxford Dictionary of Music (2006);  
 Dino Larese: Rudolf Kelterborn: Eine Lebensskizze (Amriswil: Amriswiler Bücherei, 1970).

External links
Kelterborn's official homepage (in German)
 
Sound recordings of works of the composer from the archives of Swiss Radio SRG SSR on Neo.Mx3

1931 births
2021 deaths
20th-century classical composers
20th-century conductors (music)
20th-century male musicians
21st-century classical composers
21st-century conductors (music)
21st-century male musicians
Academic staff of the Hochschule für Musik Detmold
Male conductors (music)
Swiss classical composers
Swiss conductors (music)
Swiss male classical composers
20th-century Swiss composers
21st-century Swiss composers